Lake Albina is a glacial lake in the Snowy Mountains region of New South Wales, Australia. The lake is located within the Kosciuszko National Park and the Australian Alps National Parks and Reserves.

It is located in a ravine,  with Mount Townsend to the west and Mount Lee and Mount Northcote to the east. Lake Albina drains northwards towards the Geehi River through Lady Northcote's canyon.

Ski lodge
The Lake Albina Ski Lodge was built in 1951 by The Ski Tourers Association (later renamed The Australian Alpine Club), overlooking the lake from upstream. In 1952 the first Albina Summer Slalom Cup was held, taking advantage of the seasonally unusual snow conditions. Summer time ski events continued for at least another three years on either Mount Kosciuszko or Mount Townsend. The National Parks and Wildlife Service (NPWS) required the club to vacate the lodge in 1969, and it gradually became a ruin. It was finally demolished by NPWS in 1983.

Gallery

References

Albina
Snowy Mountains
Kosciuszko National Park